Ab Anjir may refer to various places in Iran:
 Ab Anjir, Darab, Fars Province
 Ab Anjir, Jahrom, Fars Province
 Ab Anjir, Kerman
 Ab Anjir-e Olya, Kohgiluyeh and Boyer-Ahmad Province
 Ab Anjir-e Sofla, Kohgiluyeh and Boyer-Ahmad